Galbraith Lake Airport  is a state-owned, public-use airport located at Galbraith Lake in the North Slope Borough of the U.S. state of Alaska. The Arctic National Wildlife Refuge has an office at the airport. The lake and airport are located west of the Dalton Highway and north of the Trans-Alaska Pipeline System's Pump Station 4. According to the FAA's National Plan of Integrated Airport Systems for 2009–2013, it was classified as a general aviation airport.

Facilities and aircraft 
Galbraith Lake Airport has one runway designated 13/31 with a gravel surface measuring 5,182 by 150 feet (1,579 x 46 m). For the 12-month period ending July 10, 2008, the airport had 361 aircraft operations, an average of 30 per month: 49% air taxi, 44% general aviation, and 7% scheduled commercial.

References

External links 
 

Airports in North Slope Borough, Alaska